The McClymonts is an extended play recording by the sister trio The McClymonts, released in Australia on 5 June 2006 (see 2006 in music) by Universal Music Australia. It has a range between country and pop songs – written by Brooke McClymont, Samantha McClymont and Mollie McClymont.

Track listing
"Something That My Heart Does" (Brooke McClymont, Eric Nova) – 3:49
"Beyond Tomorrow" (B. McClymont, Samantha McClymont, Mollie McClymont) – 4:40
"Baby's Gone Home" (B. McClymont, M. McClymont) – 3:04
"Love You Like That" (B. McClymont, S. McClymont) – 1:57
"Jack" (B. McClymont, S. McClymont, M. McClymont) – 2:16

Personnel
Brooke McClymont – vocals
Samantha McClymont – vocals
Mollie McClymont – vocals
Warwick Scott – guitar
Dean Sutherland – bass guitar
Giuseppe Accaria – drums
Sam Hannan – keys
Hugo Marree – fiddle

Charts

References

External links 
Bellaboo interview with The McClymonts

2006 debut EPs
The McClymonts albums